Events from the year 1795 in Poland

Events

 
 - Third Partition of Poland

Births

Deaths

References

 
Years of the 18th century in Poland